The siege of Toruń was one of the battles during the Swedish invasion of Polish–Lithuanian Commonwealth (Second Northern War / Deluge). It started on 2 July 1658 and ended on 30 December 1658. Swedish garrison capitulated and Toruń returned to Polish hands.

In mid- September 1657, after the Siege of Krakow (1657), the Holy Roman Empire army of 15,000, allied to the Polish–Lithuanian Commonwealth, marched northwards. In late September, the Austrians concentrated near Plock. Polish King Jan Kazimierz wanted to use them to capture the fortified city of Toruń, but Austrian preparations for the siege were very slow and not completed before winter. Due to weather conditions, all military activities were postponed until spring 1658, and the Austrians  spent the winter in Greater Poland.

Polish plans for 1658 were concentrated on gradual recapture of the province of Royal Prussia. First objective was Toruń, a strategically located Vistula river port, with modern fortifications. Due to Dano-Swedish War, most Austrians, under Field Marshal Raimondo Montecuccoli, left Poland and marched to Jutland.

On July 2, 1658, Austrian division of 4,000, under General Jean-Louis Raduit de Souches began the siege of Toruń. The Austrians were reinforced by Polish infantry, while the city was defended by a Swedish garrison of 2,400, commanded by General Barthold Hartwig von Bulow. Swedes were supported by German-speaking, Protestant residents of Toruń.

In the first weeks, Austrian and Polish commandants limited their activities to blocking the city. On July 26, artillery barrage initiated an assault, which resulted in capture of several Swedish strongpoints. On August 1, Krzysztof Grodzicki arrived with 3,000 infantry. Soon afterwards, Jan Fryderyk Sapieha brought 1,000 soldiers, also the division of Stefan Czarniecki (4,000 cavalry) joined the Polish - Austrian forces. Furthermore, Brandenburg-Prussia division under Boguslaw Radziwill, which had switched alliances, cooperated with Poles. The division of Czarniecki remained near Toruń until early September, when it left Poland, marching towards Denmark. On October 12, Czarniecki and his soldiers reached Hamburg.

In September 1658, Polish-Austrian forces were reinforced with a division of Jerzy Lubomirski, and on September 23, Queen Marie Louise Gonzaga arrived to Torun, together with her court. By that time, the Polish army stationed near the city had almost 19,000 soldiers, while Austrian forces numbered 4,600, with 40 cannons. Main assault took place in the night of November 16/17, when Polish-Austrian soldiers captured three bastions, losing 1,000 men. The Swedish garrison finally capitulated on December 30. During the siege, the Swedes lost 1,200 men, while Poles and Austrians lost 1,800 soldiers, including 1,500 Poles.

References
Mała Encyklopedia Wojskowa, 1967, Wydanie I
Tadeusz Nowak, Oblężenie Torunia w roku 1658, nakładem Towarzystwa Naukowego, Toruń 1936
Leszek Podhorodecki, Rapier i koncerz, Warszawa 1985, p. 364-365

Torun 1658
Torun 1658
Torun 1658
Toru
Conflicts in 1658
1658 in Europe
History of Toruń
1658 in Poland